The CSV qualification for the 2006 FIVB Women's Volleyball World Championship saw member nations compete for two places at the finals in Japan.

Draw
5 CSV national teams entered qualification. The teams were seeded according to their position in the FIVB Senior Women's Rankings as of 15 January 2004. (Rankings shown in brackets)

First round

First round

Pool A
Venue:  Ginásio Aracy Machado, Cabo Frio, Brazil
Dates: August 24–28, 2005
All times are Brasília time (UTC−03:00)

|}

|}

References

External links
 2006 World Championship Qualification

2006 FIVB Volleyball Women's World Championship
2005 in volleyball
FIVB Volleyball World Championship qualification